Nai or NAI may refer to:

Music
 Nai (album), an album by singer Anna Vissi
 Nai (pan flute), a wind instrument, also known as a pan flute (Romania and Moldova)
 "Nai" (song), a 2007 CD single by Irini Merkouri

Organizations
 National Academy of Inventors, a US non-profit organization dedicated to encouraging inventors in academia.
 NASA Astrobiology Institute, an organization supporting research of life in the universe
 National Amusements, Inc, a privately owned media and entertainment company 
 National Association for Interpretation, a professional organization of interpreters
 Natural Alternatives International, the company which manufactures the nutritional supplement Juice Plus
 Netherlands Architecture Institute, a Dutch architecture institute in Rotterdam
 Network Advertising Initiative, an industry trade group that develops self-regulatory standards for online advertising
 Network Associates, Inc., a corporation now known as McAfee, Inc.
 New Atlantic Initiative, a defunct arm of the American Enterprise Institute
 Norwegian Air International, an Irish airline

Places
 Nairobi
 Nai, Rajasthan, a village in India
 Nai, Razavi Khorasan, a village in Razavi Khorasan Province, Iran
 County of Nairn, Scotland, Chapman code NAI

Science and technology
 Network Access Identifier, an Internet standard defined in RFC 4282
 Sodium iodide, a white, crystalline salt
 NaI Scintillator

Other uses
 Nai (caste), in India
 Nai (noble title), a Thai noble title
 Nai language, a language of Papua New Guinea
 National Archives of India, the official archives of the government of India
 North Adria Aviation (ICAO code), a Croatian airline
 North Allegheny Intermediate High School, in McCandless, Pennsylvania

See also
 
 
 Nay (disambiguation)
 Ney (disambiguation)
 Nal (disambiguation)